Hareesh Tibrewala is an Indian businessman and an entrepreneur. He is the joint CEO for Mirum India (a WPP Company). He has spoken on various topics related to entrepreneurship, digital marketing and  marketing automation, and has also penned articles on chatbots,  blockchain, marketing automation, augmented reality, healthcare marketing, human resources  and virtual reality.

Early life and education 
He was born in Mukundgarh, Rajasthan, India. He studied at Hindi Vidya Bhavan and earned a bachelor's degree from VJTI, University of Mumbai and a master's degree from the University of Southern California.

Career
He studied business strategy planning at AKZO-Nobel, Germany. He started his career as a partner with IFCM Counselors, a human asset management company. In 1997, he co-founded Homeindia.com. Mirum (Social Wavelength), now part of WPP plc, is Hareesh's third venture.

He was president of the Rotary Club of Mumbai, Sea Pearl, as well as the founder and co-chairperson of the expert committee on information technology at the Indian Merchants Chamber.

Hareesh addressed national and international conferences on subjects pertaining to branding, entrepreneurship and technology, apart from this Hareesh has also moderated in Mirum's flagship conferences "Future of Digital Marketing".

Awards and achievements
Social media entrepreneur of the year at WAT Awards (2012)
Impact Magazine "Top 100 Digital Professionals" (2013 and 2014)
Social Media Professional of the Year by World Brand Congress (2013)
His agency, Mirum India, won the IMC Digital Technology Award for Marketing Automation (2019) 
Accepted into Forbes Agency Council (2020)  and has been regularly featured on Forbes on subjects pertaining to marketing and technology.
Pluralsight Digi100 List Powered by Paul Writer – Hall of Fame (2017)
Adobe Digi100: India's Top 100 Digital Marketers (2018)

Books
 If I Had To Do It Again : Internet Entrepreneurs Wisdom In Hindsight – 2018, India,  Mumbai

References

Living people
Indian chief executives
Year of birth missing (living people)